The Titan Soccer Complex is a 1,000-seat soccer-specific stadium on the campus of Eastern Florida State College in Melbourne, Florida.  Built in 2013, it is currently home to the Eastern Florida Titans men's and women's soccer teams, as well as the host of the NJCAA Division I Women's Soccer National Championship from 2014 until 2016.

In 2016, it was home to Orlando City B, Orlando City SC's affiliate in the United Soccer League.  For OCB matches, the stadium's capacity was expanded to 3,500 seats.

References

External links
 Eastern Florida State College Athletics Facilities Page

Orlando City SC
Buildings and structures in Melbourne, Florida
Soccer venues in Florida
Tourist attractions in Brevard County, Florida
Sports venues completed in 2013
Sports in Brevard County, Florida
College soccer venues in the United States
2013 establishments in Florida